Estadio Edgardo Baltodano Briceño is a multi-use stadium in Liberia, Costa Rica.  It is currently used mostly for football matches and is the home stadium of Municipal Liberia.  The stadium holds 5,979 people and was built in 1970.

It has been remodelled to host 2014 FIFA U-17 Women's World Cup matches.

References

Edgardo Baltodano Briceno
Buildings and structures in Guanacaste Province